Süleymaniye Mosque is a 16th-century Ottoman mosque in Istanbul.

Süleymaniye may also refer to:


Buildings
 Suleymaniye Mosque (London), a mosque in London
 Suleymaniye Mosque (Rhodes), a mosque in Rhodes
 Süleymaniye Hamam, a hamam (public bath) in Istanbul

Places
 Süleymaniye, Akseki, a village in Akseki district of Antalya Province, Turkey
 Süleymaniye, Gümüşhane, a neighborhood of the city of Gümüşhane, Turkey
 Süleymaniye, Gelibolu

Other
 Süleymaniye FC, former name of the Turkish sports club Küçükçekmece SK

See also
 Soleymaniyeh (disambiguation)
 Sulaymaniyah (disambiguation)